The 2016 Mongolian Premier League (also known as the Khurkhree National Premier League) is the 48th edition of the tournament. Erchim came into the season as defending champions of the 2015 season.

Ulaanbaatar City (formerly Khangarid City) and Bayngol entered as the two promoted teams from the 2015 Mongolian 1st League. The season started on May 7 and ended on October 9, 2016.

Khurkhree National Premier League
The competition is to be known as the Khurkhree National Premier League for sponsorship reasons, after the Mongolian Football Federation signed a MNT 400 million sponsorship deal with Arvain Undes, a Mongolian company that produces the beer, Khurkhree.

Clubs

Clubs and locations

Results

League table

Result table

References

Mongolia Premier League seasons
2016 in Mongolian sport
Mongolia
Mongolia